ATCO Electric Yukon, formerly Yukon Electrical Company Limited (YECL), is a private electrical utility based in Whitehorse, Yukon, serving most Yukon communities and Lower Post, British Columbia. The company, founded in 1901, is owned by ATCO of Alberta. Through mergers and acquisitions, Yukon Electrical extended to serve most communities in Yukon. 

Though it owns one hydro-electric and a number of diesel generating facilities of its own, it purchases most of its power wholesale from the Yukon Energy Corporation and distributes it to consumers. From 1987 to 1997, it operated the services of Yukon Energy under contract, but in 1997, the Yukon government chose not to renew the arrangement; Yukon Energy established its own offices for management and customer service, while YECL continued to operate its own facilities.

The activities of ATCO Electrical Yukon are as follows:

Distribution only
 Whitehorse (also has a small hydro-electric generating facility at Fish Lake)
 Marsh Lake, Yukon
 Tagish, Yukon
 Carcross, Yukon
 Keno City, Yukon

Distribution and back-up generation
 Teslin, Yukon
 Haines Junction, Yukon
 Carmacks, Yukon
 Ross River, Yukon

Diesel generation and distribution
 Old Crow, Yukon
 Pelly Crossing, Yukon
 Stewart Crossing, Yukon
 Beaver Creek, Yukon
 Destruction Bay, Yukon
 Upper Liard, Yukon
 Lower Post, British Columbia
 Burwash Landing, Yukon
 Watson Lake, Yukon
 Swift River, Yukon

The only Yukon communities not served by ATCO are Dawson City, Faro, Mayo and Champagne.

See also

List of Canadian electric utilities

External links

Companies based in Whitehorse
Electric power companies of Canada
ATCO
Canadian companies established in 1901